Todd Douglas Miller is an American filmmaker known for directing the award-winning films Apollo 11 and Dinosaur 13.

Early life and career
Miller grew up in Columbus, Ohio. In the 1990s, Miller attended the Motion Picture Institute in Detroit, Michigan and Eastern Michigan University.

He is a member of the Academy of Motion Picture Arts and Sciences.

Filmography

Accolades
2014 Sundance Film Festival - US Documentary Grand Jury Prize (nominated) 
2014 Black Hills Film Festival - Best Documentary (won)
2015 News and Documentary Emmy Award - Outstanding Science and Technology Programming (won)
2019 Primetime Emmy Award for Outstanding Picture Editing For Nonfiction Programming (won)
2019 Primetime Emmy Award for Outstanding Directing for a Documentary/Nonfiction Program (nominated)
2019 Outstanding Producer of Documentary Theatrical Motion Pictures  (won)
2019 Cinema Eye Honors - Outstanding Achievement in Editing (won)
2019 American Cinema Editors Awards - Best Edited Documentary (Feature) (won)
2019 Sundance Film Festival - Special Jury Award for Editing (won)
2019 Sundance Film Festival - US Documentary Grand Jury Prize (nominated)
2019 Stephen Hawking Medal for Science Communication - Film Community (won)
2019 Los Angeles Film Critics Association Awards - Best Editing (won)
2019 Critics' Choice Documentary Awards - Best Director (nominated)
2019 Critics' Choice Documentary Awards - Best Editing (won)
2019 Critics' Choice Documentary Awards - Best Documentary Feature (won)
2019 Critics' Choice Documentary Awards - Best Archival Documentary (won)
2019 Critics' Choice Documentary Awards - Best Science/Nature Documentary (won)
2019 Peabody Awards - Documentary (won)
2019 British Academy Film Awards - Best Documentary (nominated)
2019 Independent Spirit Awards - Best Documentary Feature (nominated)

References

External links
 

Living people
American documentary filmmakers
American film editors
American film producers
Year of birth missing (living people)
Primetime Emmy Award winners